The Shetland Times is a weekly newspaper in Shetland, published on Fridays and based in Lerwick, the main town in the Shetland Islands.

The newspaper is owned by The Shetland Times Ltd, a company which also operates a publishing arm, a bookshop and a printing company. Up to October 2014, the Shetland Times Ltd claimed to have 55 employees.

Locally known as The Times, the newspaper was established in 1872 and costs £1.30. The newspaper claims a circulation figure of 11,438. It was voted Newspaper of the Year by the (Scottish) Highlands and Islands Media Awards in 2006.

Editors
From February 2006 until February 2008 the editor was Jonathan Lee, formerly of the Aberdeen Evening Express. Lee left the Shetland Times following newsroom staff passing a vote of no confidence in his editorship. He was succeeded by Paul Riddell, a former assistant editor of The Scotsman.

References

External links
The Shetland Times website

Newspapers published in Scotland
Publications established in 1872
Weekly newspapers published in the United Kingdom
Companies based in Shetland
1872 establishments in Scotland
Book publishing companies of Scotland
Lerwick
Mass media in Shetland